The Uttarbanga Cup is an Indian Football Association tournament organised in North Bengal Region to scout talent from different parts of West Bengal.

Formation
This tournament started on 27 February 2021. Uttarbanga Cup is an initiative to develop football and scout young, talented football players in North Bengal region.

Results

References 

Football cup competitions in India
Football in West Bengal
2021 establishments in India
Recurring sporting events established in 2021